Christopher Mark Francis White (born 28 April 1967 in Australia) is a British Conservative Party politician and was the Member of Parliament (MP) for Warwick and Leamington from 2010 to 2017. He lost the seat at the 2017 general election. White is currently Director of the Institute for Industrial Strategy at King's College London.

Education
White was educated at the state comprehensive St. Gregory's Catholic School, Tunbridge Wells, followed by the University of Manchester, where he obtained a BEng in Engineering, and an MBA from the University of Bath.

Career
White unsuccessfully contested the Labour stronghold of Birmingham Hall Green at the 2001 general election, then the marginal Warwick and Leamington at the 2005 general election, but was again unsuccessful. In May 2008, he was elected to Warwick District Council. At the 2010 general election, he gained Warwick and Leamington for the Conservatives, receiving 20,876 votes to the incumbent Labour MP James Plaskitt's 17,363 votes, winning by a margin of 3,513 votes. White had a notional swing of 8.8% from Labour to his party (the boundaries had been changed since the previous election). He held the seat in the 2015 general election with an increased vote of 24,249 (47.9%), leading with a majority of 6,606 votes over Labour's Lynnette Kelly.

He is Vice-Chair of cross-party UK think tank Policy Connect and a patron of the Leamington Spa-based peacebuilding charity Cord.

White proposed the Public Services (Social Value) Act 2012 in 2010 as a private member's bill, aiming to ensure that public sector procurement should take into account wider value to the community provided by suppliers. The bill, which purported to help social enterprises win more public services contracts, was supported by the government and became law in 2013 He was subsequently named as a "Social Value Ambassador" by the government, but was dismissed from the role four months later following rebelling on a vote to intervene militarily in Syria.

White was opposed to Brexit prior to the 2016 referendum.

In February 2016 he was elected chair of the Committees on Arms Export Controls.

In the 2017 general election, he lost his seat to the Labour candidate, Matt Western. In May 2018, White was announced as the inaugural Director of the Institute for Industrial Strategy at King's College London.

References

External links

Chris White MP Conservative Party profile
Chris White's page at the Warwick and Leamington Conservatives

1967 births
Living people
Alumni of the University of Manchester
Alumni of the University of Bath
Conservative Party (UK) MPs for English constituencies
UK MPs 2010–2015
UK MPs 2015–2017
Australian emigrants to England